The 20651 / 20652 Bangalore City – Talaguppa Intercity Express is a Superfast train belonging to Indian Railways South Western Railway zone that runs between  and Talaguppa in India.

Coaches
The 20651 / 52 Bangalore City - Talaguppa Intercity Express has one AC chair car, five Chair car, 14 general unreserved & two SLR (seating with luggage rake) coaches . It does not carry a pantry car coach.

As is customary with most train services in India, coach composition may be amended at the discretion of Indian Railways depending on demand.

Service

Routing

Traction
As the route is not electrified, a Hubballi Loco Shed WDP-4D diesel locomotive pulls the train to its destination.

Rake maintenance and rake sharing
Rakes are maintained by Mysuru Division of South Western Railway. This train shares its rakes with Siddhaganga Intercity Express and Tippu Express.
Day 1 - 12613>20651
Day 2 - 20652>12725
Day 3 - 12726>12614

References

External links
16201 Intercity Express at India Rail Info
16202 Intercity Express at India Rail Info

Intercity Express (Indian Railways) trains
Rail transport in Karnataka
Transport in Bangalore